Rocks is a 2019 British coming-of-age drama film directed by Sarah Gavron. The film stars Bukky Bakray as Olushola, nicknamed "Rocks", a Black British teenage girl living in Hackney, London, whose single mother abandons her and her younger brother Emmanuel (D’angelou Osei Kissiedu), forcing them to try to avoid being taken into social services.

Rocks premiered at the 2019 Toronto International Film Festival and was released in the United Kingdom on 18 September 2020. The film received acclaim from critics, and was nominated for seven awards at the 74th British Academy Film Awards, including Outstanding British Film and Best Actress in a Leading Role for Bakray, making her one of the youngest nominees for the award. Nineteen-year-old Bukky Bakray also received BAFTA Rising Star Award, becoming the youngest winner in the category.

Plot 
Rocks is a teenage girl who lives in London with her younger brother, Emmanuel, and their single mother. She has a tight-knit group of friends. A troublesome new girl, Roché, arrives at Rocks’ school and takes a liking to her, much to the chagrin of Rocks’ friends.

One day, Rocks’ mother leaves, leaving behind only a letter promising that she will return and an envelope containing an insufficient amount of money. Rocks is reluctant to tell anybody about her situation, only notifying her closest friend, Sumaya.

On the way home from school, Rocks notices a social worker outside of her home and asks that Sumaya’s family let her and Emmanuel stay for the night. At Sumaya’s house, Rocks and Sumaya have an argument after Sumaya suggests that Rocks tell an adult about her situation; Rocks expresses her resentment at Sumaya for having a nice house and a big family, and angrily ensures Sumaya that she doesn’t need her.

Rocks becomes distant from her friends and begins to spend more time with Roshé. While skipping school with Roshé one day, Rocks learns that Roshé has been making money by committing fraud via recording the credit card information of the clients at her step-mom’s salon. While Roshé is not looking, Rocks steals from her and uses the money to pay for a hotel room for the night, lying to the owner that she is Emmanuel’s mother.

Roshé eventually realizes that Rocks stole her money and makes a post online wherein she dubs Rocks a thief whose mother left her, thus notifying the student body of Rocks’ situation. Rocks and Emmanuel are kicked out by the staff at the hotel after they realize that she is a minor. Having nowhere else to go, Rocks decides to stay the night at her friend Agnes’ house.

The next morning Rocks wakes to find Emmanuel being taken away by social workers; Agnes had told her mother about the situation, and she subsequently notified authorities. Rocks reluctantly agrees to be taken by them, along with Emmanuel.

Rocks is placed in a foster home in London, while Emmanuel is placed in a home in Hastings. Rocks reconciles with her friends, who all come up with the money needed to take a train ride to Hastings so that Rocks can see Emmanuel for his birthday. However, once there, Rocks sees how happy Emmanuel is, and doesn’t have the heart to call out to him. The film ends with the girls playing on the beach.

Cast

 Bukky Bakray as Olushola "Rocks" Omotoso
 Kosar Ali as Sumaya
 D'angelou Osei Kissiedu as Emmanuel Omotoso
 Shaneigha-Monik Greyson as Roshé
 Ruby Stokes as Agnes
 Tawheda Begum as Khadijah
 Afi Okaidja as Yawa
 Anastasia Dymitrow as Sabina
 Sarah Niles as Ms. Booker
 Layo-Christina Akinlude as Funke Omotoso
 Sharon D. Clarke as Anita
 Joanna Brookes as Geraldine
 Angelica Nicole Cabutotan as Angela
 Kaine Zajaz as Mo
 Brie-Morgan Appleton as Natasha
 Ashley Merino Bastidas as Micaela
 Mohammad Amiri as Mohammed
 Islah Abdur-Rahman as Ismail
 Shola Adewusi as Grandmother Omotoso (voice)

Production 
The film was shot around East London in summer 2018. Locations include Ridley Road market.

The crew consisted of 75% women, and director Sarah Gavron cast almost exclusively non-professional actors from the local area.

Release
The film premiered at the 2019 Toronto International Film Festival in the Platform Prize program.

Reception
The website's critical consensus reads: "A fresh, funny coming-of-age story rooted in realistic characters and anchored with a meaningful message, Rocks is as solid as its title suggests." According to Metacritic, which assigned a weighted average score of 96 out of 100 based on 14 critics, the film received "universal acclaim".

Peter Bradshaw of The Guardian gave it five stars, praising the film's poignancy and tragedy, and stating, "society will probably not find a way to tap this resource. When the class is taught about Picasso and cubism and they make spoof Picasso cut-out images of people's faces cut from magazines, it is a funny moment, but serious too, because there is a real sense of potential. This film is such a rush of vitality. It rocks." Writing for The Telegraph, Robbie Collins also gave the film five stars, saying: "Rocks would rather reckon with – and in the end, celebrate – youthful potential itself, and its extraordinary ability to flower in even the most unpromising soil." The Independent gave it four stars, saying, "Rocks is a heartfelt testament to the resilience of teenage girls."

Accolades
At the 74th British Academy Film Awards, Rocks earned 7 nominations, tied with Nomadland for the most of the ceremony.

Rocks won the Jury Prize in International Competition at the 2020 Brussels International Film Festival (BRIFF), ex aequo with Favolacce (Bad Tales).

References

External links
 
 
 Official screenplay

2019 films
2010s coming-of-age drama films
British coming-of-age drama films
Films shot in London
2010s English-language films
Black British cinema
Black British mass media
Black British films
British female buddy films
2010s female buddy films
2010s British films
British independent films
2019 independent films